Monami Ghosh is an Indian Bengali film and television actress with a career spanning almost two decades. She has acted in several television serials, among which the 2009 ETV Bangla serial Binni Dhaner Khoi is noteworthy.

Career 
Ghosh started her acting career with the Bengali television serial Saat Kahon (aired on DD Bangla) when she was 17 years old. She has played the lead in 25–30 serials for which she has become famous for her portrayal of the characters Ananya in Pratiksha Ektu Bhalobashar... (2001–02), Komolika in Kon Shey Alor Swapno Niye (2003), Zeenat in Ek Akasher Niche (2004-04), and Barsha in Ekdin Pratidin. Her most well known performance is the character Mohor and in the ETV Bangla serial Binni Dhaner Khoi (2009-2013) where she also played the character Lin (Mohor's daughter).

In parallel to her television career, Ghosh has appeared in several film roles. In 2008, she finished shooting for Aniruddha Banerjee's film Box No. 1313 opposite Parambrata Chatterjee. In 2012, she acted in Anik Dutta's Bengali film Bhooter Bhabishyat, in which she played the role of "Lachhmi". She also appeared in the 2015 film Bela Seshe directed by the duo Nandita Roy and Shiboprosad Mukherjee, and as "Piu", and "Jiniya" in the 2018 cross-border film Maati starring Adil Hussain and Paoli Dam.

Monami Ghosh went on to appear in more Bengali television serials like the 2013 ETV Bangla series Hiyar Majhe, which had the same unit employed on Binni Dhaner Khoi. Her character in the show was that of Bhromor aka Kurani. Her co-actor was Badsah Maitra. She then appeared in Sadhak Bamakhyapa and Amloki, and starred as Kankaboti Banerjee, aka Kankon, in the 2015 Star Jalsha drama series Punyi Pukur. In 2018, she began playing the character of "Iraboti Mitra" in the serial Irabotir Chupkotha on Star Jalsha.

Filmography 

 Hoyto Premer Jonno (Unreleased)
 Kalo Chita (2004)
 Ek Mutho Chobi (2005)
 Box No. 1313 (2009)
 Ogo Bodhu Sundari (2010)
 Bhallu Sardar (2012)
 Bhooter Bhabishyat (2012) as Lachhmi
 Bela Seshe (2015) as Piu  
 Maati (2018) as Jiniya
 Belashuru (2022) as Piu
 Padatik (2023) as Gita Sen

Television

Web series

Mahalaya

References

External links 
 

1984 births
Living people
21st-century Indian actresses
Indian film actresses
Indian television actresses
Actresses in Bengali cinema
Bengali television actresses
Actresses in Bengali television